The Archdiocese of Canada is a diocese of the Orthodox Church in America (OCA). Its territory includes parishes, monasteries, and missions located in nine provinces and territories in Canada—Alberta, British Columbia, Manitoba, Newfoundland, Nova Scotia, Ontario, Quebec, Saskatchewan, and Yukon. The diocesan center is located in Rawdon, Quebec.

The Archdiocese of Canada is the descendant in Canada of the Orthodox mission of the Russian Empire in North America. The diocese was founded and incorporated by Saint Tikhon, Patriarch of Moscow and all Rus, in 1903.

Seraphim (Storheim) was consecrated auxiliary bishop of Edmonton in 1987, and became ruling bishop of the archdiocese of Canada in 1990. He was elevated to Archbishop during the Spring Holy Synod meeting in March 2007.

On April 2, 2009, the Holy Synod of the Orthodox Church in America, elevated Higoumène Irénée (Rochon) to the rank of Archimandrite, and elected him to be Auxiliary Bishop for Archbishop Seraphim of Ottawa and Canada, with the title of Bishop of Québec City. On October 21, 2014, the Holy Synod of Bishops of the Orthodox Church in America elected Bishop Irénée as Bishop of Ottawa and the Archdiocese of Canada. On March 20, 2015, during the Spring Session of the Holy Synod of Bishops of the Orthodox Church in America, Bishop Irénée was elevated to the rank of Archbishop of Ottawa and the Archdiocese of Canada.

Deaneries 
The diocese is grouped geographically into five deaneries, each consisting of a number of parishes. Each deanery is headed by a parish priest, known as a dean. The deans coordinate activities in their area's parishes, and report to the diocesan bishop.  the deaneries of the Archdiocese of Canada were:
Alberta and Northwest Territories Deanery
British Columbia and Yukon Deanery
Manitoba, Saskatchewan and Nunavut Deanery
Ontario Deanery
Quebec & Atlantic Provinces Deanery

External links
 

Canada
Eastern Orthodox dioceses in Canada